Logan O'Hoppe (born February 9, 2000) is an American professional baseball catcher for the Los Angeles Angels of Major League Baseball (MLB).

O'Hoppe was born in West Islip, New York and attended St. John the Baptist Diocesan High School, committing to play college baseball for East Carolina University. He forewent his college commitment when he was drafted by the Philadelphia Phillies in the 23rd round of the 2018 Major League Baseball draft. O'Hoppe spent his first five professional seasons in the Phillies farm system, garnering media consideration as one of the team's top prospects. In August 2022, O'Hoppe was traded to the Angels at the trade deadline and he made his major league debut the next month.

Early life
Logan O'Hoppe was born on February 9, 2000, in West Islip, New York and grew up on Long Island in Sayville, New York. He attended St. John the Baptist Diocesan High School in West Islip. In 2018, O'Hoppe's senior season, he posted a .467 batting average with three home runs and 22 runs batted in (RBI) in 21 games. He was named the Catholic High School Athletic Association Player of the Year after winning the Triple Crown and leading St. John to its first league championship since 2014. He was later awarded a high-school-level Gold Glove Award, recognizing him as the top high school catcher in the country. After spending three years as the starting catcher for St. John, O'Hoppe finished his high school career batting .434 with five home runs and 43 RBIs. He committed to play college baseball for East Carolina University, his father's alma mater.

Professional career

Philadelphia Phillies organization
The Philadelphia Phillies selected O'Hoppe in the 23rd round of the 2018 Major League Baseball draft, the 677th overall pick. He signed with the team for $215,000, forgoing his commitment to play for the East Carolina Pirates. O'Hoppe made his professional debut in the Rookie-level Gulf Coast League (GCL) with the GCL Phillies. In his first game, O'Hoppe went 1-for-2 with a walk and a run. He spent the rest of 2018 in the GCL, finishing with a .367 batting average, two home runs, and 21 RBIs in 34 games.

At the start of the 2019 season, O'Hoppe was promoted to the Class A Short Season Williamsport Crosscutters of the New York–Penn League (NYPL). Midway through the season, he was selected to play in the NYPL All-Star game. During the game on August 21, he went 0-for-1 in a pinch hit appearance. He finished the season batting .216 with five home runs and 26 RBIs over 45 games. After the season, O'Hoppe played overseas for the Adelaide Giants of the Australian Baseball League, a non-MLB affiliate. In 28 games with the Giants, O'Hoppe batted .258 with five home runs and 18 RBIs.

In 2020, O'Hoppe did not play any official games due to the COVID-19-related cancellation of the minor league season. In lieu of minor league play, O'Hoppe was among a group of Phillies prospects invited to the team's alternate training site as a member of the 60-man player pool. Phillies farm director Josh Bonifay praised O'Hoppe's work at the site, saying that his bat-to-ball skills were top in the organization.

O'Hoppe started 2021 with the High-A Jersey Shore BlueClaws of the High-A East league. In 85 games with Jersey Shore, O'Hoppe batted .270 with 13 home runs and 48 RBIs. On August 25, he was promoted to the Double-A Reading Fightin Phils of the Double-A Northeast league. In 13 games with Reading, he batted .296 with three home runs and seven RBIs. On September 22, O'Hoppe was promoted to the Triple-A Lehigh Valley IronPigs of the Triple-A East league. He spent the final six games of the season with Lehigh Valley, going 4-for-21 (.196) with a home run and three RBIs. Between the three teams, O'Hoppe finished the 2021 season batting .270 with 17 home runs and 58 RBIs in 104 games. Following the season, O'Hoppe played for the Peoria Javelinas of the Arizona Fall League (AFL), batting .299 with three home runs and 17 RBIs in 22 games. He won the AFL's Dernell Stenson Award for sportsmanship.

O'Hoppe returned to Reading to open the 2022 season. During an MLB Pipeline re-rank of the Phillies farm system, O'Hoppe moved up from his #11 position in 2021 to #3 in 2022. In mid-June, O'Hoppe appeared on Pipeline's league-wide top 100 prospect ranking for the first time, moving in after Minnesota Twins infielder José Miranda graduated from his prospect status. On July 16, O'Hoppe played in the All-Star Futures Game at Dodger Stadium, going 0-for-1 at the plate. Through 75 games with Reading, O'Hoppe was batting .275 with 15 home runs and 45 RBIs.

Los Angeles Angels
On August 2, 2022, O'Hoppe was traded to the Los Angeles Angels in exchange for outfielder Brandon Marsh. Media analysts cited the extended presence of veteran catcher J. T. Realmuto on the Phillies' big league roster as a primary reason for the trade, as well as Philadelphia's need for a center fielder. After the trade, MLB Pipeline ranked O'Hoppe as the Angels' top prospect and promoted him to #67 on the league-wide ranking.

The Angels assigned O'Hoppe to the Double-A Rocket City Trash Pandas of the Southern League. In his first seven games with the team, he hit five home runs. In 29 total games, O'Hoppe batted .306 with 11 home runs, 33 RBIs, and a 1.147 on-base plus slugging (OPS), the highest in his minor league career. During the Southern League postseason, he went 2-for-10 (.200) with an RBI in three games. After the conclusion of the minor league season, Keith Law of The Athletic ranked O'Hoppe as the 2022 Prospect of the Year.

On September 27, the Angels added O'Hoppe to their taxi squad and announced his promotion to the major leagues later that evening. He made his debut on September 28, starting at catcher and recording his first major league hit off of Oakland Athletics pitcher Adrián Martínez in his first career at bat. In his brief first season, he batted .286 with two RBIs in five games.

Personal life
O'Hoppe's father, Michael, was diagnosed with non-Hodgkin lymphoma in August 2021. After multiple rounds of chemotherapy, Michael was determined to be cancer-free in April 2022. The O'Hoppe family was present at Angel Stadium for Logan's MLB debut in September 2022.

References

External links

2000 births
Living people
Adelaide Giants players
Baseball players from New York (state)
Florida Complex League Phillies players
Jersey Shore BlueClaws players
Lehigh Valley IronPigs players
Los Angeles Angels players
Major League Baseball catchers
People from West Islip, New York
Peoria Javelinas players
Reading Fightin Phils players
Rocket City Trash Pandas players
St. John the Baptist Diocesan High School alumni
Williamsport Crosscutters players